Pinedale Shores is an unincorporated community in Saint Clair County, Alabama, United States, located near Ashville.

References

Unincorporated communities in Alabama
Unincorporated communities in St. Clair County, Alabama